was a Japanese samurai, the younger brother of the warlord, Oda Nobunaga following the Sengoku period of the 16th century. 

Following the year of 1568, Nobukane was destined to be adopted into the Nagano clan. Nobukane afterwards shaved his head 
and become monk, following the year of 1594.

Family
Father: Oda Nobuhide (1510–1551)
Mother: Tsuchida Gozen (died 1594)
Brothers
Oda Nobuhiro (died 1574)
Oda Nobunaga (1534–1582)
Oda Nobuyuki (1536–1557)
Oda Nagamasu (1548–1622)
Oda Nobuharu (1549–1570)
Oda Nobutoki (died 1556)
Oda Nobuoki  
Oda Hidetaka (died 1555)
Oda Hidenari
Oda Nobuteru
Oda Nagatoshi
Sisters:
Oichi (1547–1583)
Oinu

References
 The Samurai Sourcebook

1548 births
1614 deaths
Oda clan